Helenów  is a village in the administrative district of Gmina Szczawin Kościelny, within Gostynin County, Masovian Voivodeship, in east-central Poland.

References

Villages in Gostynin County